This is a list of bassists known for their slap bass technique.

A
 Dave Allen (Shriekback)
 Mark Adams (Slave)
 George Anderson (Shakatak)
 Emma Anzai (Sick Puppies)
 Tomohito Aoki (solo artist, Toshiki Kadomatsu and others)
 Eugene Abdukhanov (Jinjer)

B
 Davie504 (Real name Davide Biale, Solo Artist and YouTuber)
 Nick Beggs (Kajagoogoo)
 Jeff Berlin (solo artist, Bill Bruford) 
 Cliff Burton (Metallica)
 Brian Bromberg (solo artist)
 Charles Berthoud (Solo Artist and YouTube)

C
 Alain Caron (solo artist, Uzeb)
 Tony Choy (Atheist, Pestilence, Cynic)
 Tim Commerford (Rage Against the Machine)
 Lynn Copeland (Big Mountain)
 Stanley Clarke (solo artist, Return to Forever, Chick Corea)
 Les Claypool (solo artist, Oysterhead, Primus)
 Bootsy Collins (solo artist, Bootsy's Rubber Band, Funkadelic, Parliament, Praxis)

D
 Glen Diani (One Minute Silence)
 Trevor Dunn (Mr. Bungle, Fantômas, Secret Chiefs 3, Trevor Dunn's Trio-Convulsant, David Krakauer)

E
 Nathan East (Eric Clapton, Phil Collins, Fourplay)
 Bernard Edwards (Chic, Sister Sledge, Diana Ross, Power Station)
 David Ellefson (Megadeth)

F
 Nick Fyffe (Jamiroquai), (David Jordan)
 John Norwood Fisher (Fishbone)
 Lex Feltham (Frenzal Rhomb)
 Fieldy (Korn)
 Flea (Red Hot Chili Peppers) 
 Derek Forbes (Simple Minds and Propaganda)

G
 Marshall Grant (Johnny Cash and The Tennessee Three)
 Leigh Gorman (Bow Wow Wow)
 Larry Graham (Sly and the Family Stone, Graham Central Station, Prince)
 Mike Gordon (Phish)
 Billy Gould (Faith No More)

H
 Stu Hamm (solo artist, Steve Vai, Joe Satriani and others)
 Milt Hinton (Cab Calloway and others)
 Jeph Howard (The Used)

J
 Louis Johnson (The Brothers Johnson, Quincy Jones, Michael Jackson, George Duke)
 John Paul Jones (Led Zeppelin, Them Crooked Vultures)

K
 Mark King (Level 42)
 Tony Kanal (No Doubt)
 Khaled 'Bassbaba' Sumon (Aurthohin)

L
 Eric Langlois (Cryptopsy)
 Terry Lewis (The Time)
 Dirk Lance (Formerly in Incubus)
 Dave LaRue (Dixie Dregs, Steve Morse Band and others)
 Henrik Linder (Dirty Loops)
 Trevor Lindsey (Aaron Neville)
 Russell Lock (Multi-Instrumental Virtuoso)
 Abraham Laboriel (Friendship, Koinonia)

M
 Martin Mendez (Opeth)
 Marcus Miller (solo artist, Miles Davis, David Sanborn, Luther Vandross)
 Ryan Martinie (Mudvayne, Soften The Glare)
 Arif Mirabdolbaghi (Protest The Hero)

N
 Meshell Ndegeocello

 Jason Newsted (Metallica)

P
 Guy Pratt (The Orb, Pink Floyd, David Gilmour)
 Jorge Pescara (solo artist, Ithamara Koorax, Dom Um Romao, Eumir Deodato, Luis Bonfa)
 Dave Pomeroy
 Mike Percy (Dead Or Alive (band))

R
 Rayna Foss-Rose (Coal Chamber)

S
 Saidus Salehin Khaled (Bassbaba Sumon)
 Mitsuru Sutoh (T-Square)
 Tetsuo Sakurai (Casiopea, Jimsaku, solo artist)
 Muzz Skillings (Living Colour)
 T. M. Stevens (Solo Artist, The Headhunters, Victor Wooten, Steve Vai, James Brown, Billy Joel, Tina Turner, Joe Cocker)

T
 Robert Trujillo (Metallica, Suicidal Tendencies, Ozzy Osbourne, Black Label Society)
 Toshiya (Dir En Grey)
 Tom Araya (Slayer)
 Taneda Takeshi (Crush 40)

U
Futoshi Uehara (Maximum The Hormone)

V
Jayen Varma

W
 Jimbo Wallace (The Reverend Horton Heat)
 Mike Watt (Minutemen)
 Mark White (Spin Doctors)
 Doug Wimbish (Sugarhill Gang, Grandmaster Flash, Living Colour, Mick Jagger)
 Chris Wolstenholme (Muse)
 Victor Wooten (solo artist, Béla Fleck and the Flecktones, SMV) 
 Amos Williams (TesseracT)
 Mark Weber  Average White Band
 Aaron Wills (AKA Pnut) 311

Y
 Yoshihiro Naruse (Casiopea)

Z
 Stuart Zender (Formerly in Jamiroquai)

See also 
List of slap bass players (double bass)

References 

 
slap bass